Geneviève Bujold (born July 1, 1942) is a Canadian actress. For her portrayal of Anne Boleyn in the period drama film Anne of the Thousand Days (1969), Bujold received a nomination for the Academy Award for Best Actress. Her other film credits include The Trojan Women (1971), Earthquake (1974), Obsession (1976), Coma (1978), Murder by Decree (1979),  Tightrope (1984), Choose Me (1984), Dead Ringers (1988), The House of Yes (1997), and Still Mine (2012).

Life and career

Early life
She was born in Montreal, Quebec, the daughter of Laurette (née Cavanagh), a maid, and Joseph Firmin Bujold, a bus driver. She is of French Canadian descent, with distant Irish ancestry.

Bujold received a strict convent education for twelve years, which she disliked. She was expelled from the convent for reportedly reading Fanny by Marcel Pagnol.
She entered the Montreal Conservatory of Dramatic Art, where she was trained in the classics of French theatre.

Early career
Two months before she was to graduate she made her stage debut as Rosine in Le Barbier de Séville in 1961 with Theâtre de Gesù. She quit the school and was rarely out of work, being in demand for radio, stage, TV and film. Bujold made her TV debut with Le square (1963), a 60-minute TV film based on a play by Marguerite Duras, co-starring Georges Groulx.
She was in episodes of Jeudi-théâtre ("Atout... Meurtre") and Les belles histoires des pays d'en haut ("La terre de Bidou") and guest starred on Ti-Jean caribou.
Her Canadian feature film debut was in Amanita Pestilens (1963). She was then in an international co production La fleur de l'âge, ou Les adolescentes (1964) and had a lead role in La terre à boire (1964), the first Quebec feature to be privately financed.
Bujold starred in two 30 minute shorts, La fin des étés (1964) and Geneviève (1964).  She toured Canada performing plays also worked steadily in radio and was voted actress of the year in Montreal.

French films
In 1965, she toured Russia and France with the company of the Théâtre du Rideau Vert. While in Paris, Bujold was in a play A House... and a Day when she was seen by renowned French director Alain Resnais. He selected her for a role in his film The War Is Over, opposite Yves Montand and Ingrid Thulin.
She returned home briefly to appear in "Romeo and Jeannette" by Jean Anouilh alongside Michael Sarrazin, for a Canadian TV show Festival. Also for that show she did productions of The Murderer and A Doll's House. She contributed with vocals in The Devil's Toy, a documentary about skateboarding in Montreal, directed by Claude Jutra (1966).

She stayed in France to make two more films: Philippe de Broca's King of Hearts (1966), with Alan Bates, and Louis Malle's The Thief of Paris (1967), with Jean-Paul Belmondo. Bujold won the Prix Suzanne as the Discovery of the Year and Elle magazine called her The Girl of the Day. Despite having established herself in France, however, she returned to Canada.

Return to Canada
Upon her return to Canada, Bujold married film director Paul Almond in 1967. He directed her in "The Puppet Caravan" for Festival in 1967. She appeared in Michel Brault's film Between Salt and Sweet Water (1967), then went to New York to play the title role in a production of Saint Joan (1967) for Hallmark Hall of Fame on American TV. Although she said she preferred film most and television least out of all the mediums, she received great acclaim for this including an Emmy nomination.

In Canada she starred in Isabel (1968), written and directed by Almond.  It was one of the first Canadian films to be picked up for distribution by a major Hollywood studio.

Anne of the Thousand Days and international stardom
International recognition came in 1969, when she starred as Anne Boleyn in Charles Jarrott's film Anne of the Thousand Days, with Richard Burton. Producer Hal B. Wallis cast her after seeing her in Isabel.

For her performance, she received the Golden Globe Award for Best Actress in a Motion Picture – Drama, and received a nomination for the Academy Award for Best Actress. It was released by Universal who signed her to a three-picture contract.

Back in Canada, she did a second feature with her husband, The Act of the Heart (1970), co starring Donald Sutherland, which earned her a Best Actress at the Canadian Film Awards. She wrote and starred in a short film, Marie-Christine (1970), directed by Claude Jutra.
Wallis and Universal wanted Bujold to star in Mary, Queen of Scots (1971) but she refused so they sued her for $450,000.

Instead she played the role of Cassandra, a Greek prophet, in Michael Cacoyannis's film version of The Trojan Women (1971), opposite Katharine Hepburn, Vanessa Redgrave, and Irene Papas. It was shot in Spain.
In Canada, she made Journey (1972) with Almond and co-starring John Vernon. Bujold won another Canadian Film Award for Best Actress. She and Almond would divorce in 1974 after multiple separations and reconciliations.
She starred in Claude Jutra's Kamouraska (1973), based on a novel by Anne Hébert, for which she received her third Canadian Film Award for Best Actress.
In the US, she appeared in an adaptation of Jean Anouilh's Antigone for PBS's Great Performances in 1974.

Hollywood
In 1973, after her marriage to Paul Almond ended, she relocated to Los Angeles. Shortly thereafter, she settled the lawsuit with Universal, agreeing to a three-picture film contract starting with Earthquake (1974), with Charlton Heston. 

Bujold went to France to make Incorrigible (1975) with de Broca and Belmondo. For Hallmark Hall of Fame and the BBC she appeared in Caesar and Cleopatra (1975) alongside Alec Guinness.

At Universal Studios, she was the lead in Swashbuckler (1976) alongside Robert Shaw. In an interview she said, "Robert Shaw is a man worth knowing."

In 1976, she appeared in Obsession (1976) directed by Brian De Palma co-starring Cliff Robertson (1976).
Bujold made Alex & the Gypsy (1976) with Jack Lemmon and Another Man, Another Chance (1977), co-starring James Caan (1977) for Claude Lelouch.

She was lead with Michael Douglas in the medical thriller Coma (1978), directed by Michael Crichton, which was a box office hit.

Bujold returned to Canada to play a key role in the Sherlock Holmes film Murder by Decree (1979), which won her a Best Supporting Actress Award at the Canadian Film Awards.

For Walt Disney she appeared in the fantasy film The Last Flight of Noah's Ark (1980) with Elliott Gould and Charles Jarrott, director of Anne of the Thousand Days. She was directed by Almond once more in the Canadian Final Assignment (1980).

Bujold starred in a TV movie Mistress of Paradise (1981), then supported Christopher Reeve in Monsignor (1982), and Clint Eastwood in Tightrope (1984).

Alan Rudolph
Bujold starred in Choose Me (1984), directed and written by Alan Rudolph. She promptly made two more films for Rudolph: Trouble in Mind (1985) and The Moderns (1988), the latter set in Paris in the 1920s. She was part of his informal company of actors that he repeatedly used in his films, including Keith Carradine.

Bujold starred in David Cronenberg's Dead Ringers (1988) opposite Jeremy Irons, then made a TV movie Red Earth, White Earth (1989). She did False Identity (1990) with Stacy Keach.

Canada
After a long absence from Quebec, she returned to appear in two more films by Michel Brault: The Paper Wedding (1989), and My Friend Max (1994). In between she went to France to make Rue du Bac (1991), and did another film with Almond, The Dance Goes On (1991), the latter featuring their son, Matthew (born in 1968). She had support roles in Oh, What a Night (1993), and An Ambush of Ghosts (1993).

Star Trek
In 1994, Bujold was chosen to play Captain Nicole Janeway (subsequently renamed Kathryn Janeway), lead character in the ensemble cast of the American television series Star Trek: Voyager. However, she left the project after just two days of filming, because of the demanding work schedule. Kate Mulgrew was subsequently cast in the role.

Later career
Bujold had supporting roles in The Adventures of Pinocchio (1995), The House of Yes (1997), Last Night (1998), You Can Thank Me Later (1998), Eye of the Beholder (1999), The Bookfair Murders (2000), Children of My Heart (2001) and Alex in Wonder (2001)

Bujold was in Dead Innocent (1997) and was in a short Matisse & Picasso: A Gentle Rivalry (2001).

Bujold was back in Quebec to star in Chaos and Desire (2002), directed by Manon Briand. That year she said "I like doing studio films, independent films. I want to step up to the plate and do it. The role doesn't have to be long, but it has to be essential to the film. And it's got to be truthful to me. I defend my characters. They're like my babies."

Bujold's later appearances include Jericho Mansions (2003), Finding Home (2004), Downtown: A Street Tale (2004), By the Pricking of My Thumbs (2005), Disappearances (2006), and Deliver Me (2006).

Bujold was also in The Trotsky (2009), For the Love of God (2011), and Northern Borders (2013).
 
In 2012, Bujold played a woman battling dementia in the sleeper romantic drama Still Mine. Stephen Holden of The New York Times commented: "Ms. Bujold imbues Irene with a starchy tenacity and a sharp sense of humor", while The Washington Post called her performance "superb" and "remarkably detailed".

Bujold's later films include Chorus (2015).

Accolades

Filmography

Film

Television

References

External links
 
 profile at The Canadian Encyclopedia

1942 births
20th-century Canadian actresses
21st-century Canadian actresses
Actresses from Montreal
Best Actress Genie and Canadian Screen Award winners
Best Drama Actress Golden Globe (film) winners
Best Supporting Actress Genie and Canadian Screen Award winners
Canadian film actresses
Canadian stage actresses
Canadian television actresses
Canadian voice actresses
French Quebecers
Living people
Canadian people of Irish descent